The 458th Tactical Fighter Squadron is an inactive United States Air Force unit. It was last assigned to the 506th Tactical Fighter Wing at Tinker Air Force Base, Oklahoma, where it was inactivated on 1 April 1959.

History

World War II

Trained in the continental United States, Oct 1944 – Feb 1945. Moved to western Pacific Ocean in spring of 1945. Escorted Boeing B-29 Superfortress bombers in raids against Japan, and attacked targets such as enemy airfields, May-Aug 1945.

Cold War
Between 1953 and 1959 the unit trained for a variety of tactical air missions. Frequently deployed for training exercises, some of them overseas.

Lineage
 Constituted as the 458th Fighter Squadron, Single Engine on 5 October 1944
 Activated on 21 October 1944
 Inactivated on 16 December 1945
 Redesignated 458th Strategic Fighter Squadron on 20 November 1952
 Activated on 20 January 1953
 Redesignated 458th Fighter-Day Squadron on 1 July 1957
 Redesignated 458th Fighter-Bomber Squadron on 1 January 1958
 Redesignated 458th Tactical Fighter Squadron on 1 July 1958
 Inactivated on 1 April 1959

Assignments
 506th Fighter Group, 21 October 1944 – 16 December 1945
 506th Strategic Fighter Wing (later 506th Fighter-Day Wing, 506th Fighter-Bomber Wing, 506th Tactical Fighter Wing), 20 January 1953 – 1 April 1959

Stations
 Lakeland Army Air Field, Florida, 21 October 1944 – 16 February 1945
 North Field, Iwo Jima, 24 April – 3 December 1945
 Camp Anza, California, 15–16 December 1945
 Dow Air Force Base, Maine, 20 January 1953
 Tinker Air Force Base, Oklahoma, 20 March 1955 – 1 April 1959

Aircraft
 North American P-51 Mustang, 1944-1945
 Republic F-84 Thunderjet, 1953-1957
 North American F-100 Super Sabre, 1957-1958

References

Notes
 Explanatory notes

 Citations

Bibliography

 
 
 
 

458
Fighter 0458